Aminabad (also Romanized as Amīnābād) is a village in Baraghan Rural District, Chendar District, Savojbolagh County, Alborz Province, Iran. At the 2006 census, its population was 37, in 8 families.

References 

Populated places in Savojbolagh County